USS Saidor (CVE-117) was a  of the United States Navy.

Originally named the Saltery Bay, she was renamed on 5 June 1944, was laid down on 29 September 1944 by Todd-Pacific Shipyards, Inc., Tacoma, Washington; launched on 17 March 1945; sponsored by Mrs. Walter F. Boone; and commissioned on 4 September 1945, Capt. A. P. Storrs in command.

Following shakedown off the United States west coast, she served at Pearl Harbor from 12 December 1945 to 20 March 1946. Sailing via the Panama Canal, she operated at Norfolk, Va., from 16 April to 22 April, before returning via the Panama Canal to the west coast. Departing San Diego on 6 May, Saidor arrived at Bikini on the 24th to serve as a photographic laboratory for the atomic bomb testing program, Operation Crossroads. She processed film, documenting the destructive power of atomic weapons on selected targets at various ranges, during the nuclear explosions of 1 July and 25 July. She departed Bikini on 4 August and returned to San Diego where she remained into 1947, when she began inactivation.

Saidor was decommissioned on 12 September 1947 and berthed with the Pacific Reserve Fleet at San Diego. Reclassified CVHE-117 on 12 June 1955, and AKV-17 on 7 May 1959, she remained in the Reserve Fleet until 1 December 1970 when she was struck from the Navy list. She was sold to American Ship Dismantlers, Portland, Oreg., for scrapping on 22 October 1971.

References

External links
 Photo gallery at navsource.org

 

Commencement Bay-class escort carriers
1945 ships
World War II escort aircraft carriers of the United States